Caledonia is the eighth studio album by the German melodic death metal band SuidAkrA. The lyrical themes of Caledonia are the mystical side of the tribe of the Picts, their war against the attacking Roman Empire and the co-incidence of these two completely different worlds.

It was released in the USA on  through Locomotive Records.

Track listing 
All music by SuidAkrA. All lyrics written by Marcel Schoenen.
 "Highland Hills" – 8:01
 "A Blackened Shield" – 5:15
 "The Ember Deid (Part II)" – 3:15 
 "Evoke the Demon" – 5:27
 "Forth-Clyde" – 5:31
 "Ramble" – 2:57
 "Dawning Tempest" – 5:13
 "The Distant Call" – 3:34
 "On Torrid Sand" – 3:52
 "The IXth Legion" – 5:44
 "Farewell" – 1:14

Personnel 

 Arkadius Antonik – guitars, vocals
 Marcel Schoenen – guitars, vocals, lyrics
 Marcus Riewaldt – bass
 Lars Wehner – drums
 Axel Römer - bagpipes
 Martin Buchwalter – mixing
 Michael Schwabe – mastering

External links 
 Lyrics on the official SuidAkrA website

References 

2006 albums
Suidakra albums